Hawkley Hall High School is a co-educational, non-selective secondary school with academy status located in Wigan, Greater Manchester, England, specialising in engineering.

Location and facilities 
The school's site is located in Hawkley Hall, and can be reached easily by bus and foot. The main building A Block was built in the early 1990s, with the English, Humanities, ICT, Art department and the schools library currently occupying the building. The remainder of the school was built in the early 1980s, with dedicated blocks for: Languages, Mathematics, Music, Creative arts and the specialist engineering block. The P.E. department consists of an astroturf all-weather pitch, Hard Netball courts, Indoor sports hall and playing field.

2019 Ofsted inspection 
Hawkley Hall is now a 'good' school, being rated 2 in all categories.

Other notes 
Bryn Park FC and Hawkley Bridge FC use the school's all-weather pitch every Wednesday for training purposes.

References 

 http://www.hawkleyhall.wigan.sch.uk/index.php?option=com_content&task=blogsection&id=2&Itemid=35

Secondary schools in the Metropolitan Borough of Wigan
Academies in the Metropolitan Borough of Wigan
Specialist engineering colleges in England